Black City is the fourth studio album by Matthew Dear. It was released via Ghostly International in 2010. It peaked at number 17 on the Billboard Top Dance/Electronic Albums chart, as well as number 29 on the Heatseekers Albums chart.

Critical reception

At Metacritic, which assigns a weighted average score out of 100 to reviews from mainstream critics, Black City received an average score of 78, based on 23 reviews, indicating "generally favorable reviews".

Pitchfork placed it at number 46 on its list of "The Top 50 Albums of 2010".

Track listing

Personnel
Credits adapted from liner notes.

 Matthew Dear – production
 Paul Gold – mastering
 Will Calcutt – artwork, photography

Charts

References

External links
 

2010 albums
Matthew Dear albums
Ghostly International albums